Taiga Satoru, born Satoshi Kawasaki (January 3, 1950 – July 16, 2009), was a sumo wrestler from Kanoya, Kagoshima, Japan. He made his professional debut in March 1965, and reached the top division in July 1969. His highest rank was maegashira 1. He left the sumo world upon retirement in May 1977.

Career record

See also
Glossary of sumo terms
List of past sumo wrestlers
List of sumo tournament second division champions

References

1950 births
2009 deaths
Japanese sumo wrestlers
Sumo people from Kagoshima Prefecture
People from Kanoya, Kagoshima